Kilcolman Castle is a tower house located in County Cork, Ireland. It was formerly the residence of the poet Edmund Spenser.

Location

History
This was anciently the site of a ringfort named Cathair Gobhann, "the smith's cathair", belonging to the Uí Rossa tribe of Mogh Ruith.

The castle was built in the 1420s by James FitzGerald, 6th Earl of Desmond, who bought the land from William, Lord Barry around 1418.

Confiscated by the Crown after the Second Desmond Rebellion (1579–1583), the castle passed to Philip Sidney. He refurbished the castle and lived there for ten years, during which time, he wrote his epic poem The Faerie Queene (published 1590–96), inspired by the Tudor conquest of Ireland and influenced by the wild Munster scenery. He also wrote A View of the Present State of Irelande, Epithalamion, the Amoretti sonnet sequence and Colin Clouts Come Home Againe.

In 1598, during the Nine Years' War, Kilcolman Castle was destroyed by the forces of Hugh O'Neill, Earl of Tyrone. Spenser escaped; his son Sylvanus rebuilt Kilcolman but it was again destroyed in 1622 and, afterwards, abandoned.

Description
It is a typical late mediaeval tower house with a bawn (a curtain wall). It is four storeys tall; on the interior were a basement, parlour, armoury, privy, chapel, study and private rooms.

References

External links
Centering Spenser: A Digital Resource for Kilcolman Castle

Castles in County Cork
Edmund Spenser
1420s establishments in Ireland